Guerrilla Girl may refer to:

Guerrilla Girls, an anonymous group of radical feminist, female artists
Guerrilla Girl (1953 film)
Guerrilla Girl (2005 film)

See also
Gorilla Girl, a fictional superheroine appearing in American comic books published by Marvel Comics